Elizabeth Morrison or its shortened versions may refer to:
Elizabeth Morrison (Hollyoaks), a fictional character in the British TV soap Hollyoaks
Miss Elizabeth Morrison, a fictional character played by Wendy Hiller in the 1981 film Miss Morrison's Ghosts
Liz Morrison, a fictional character in the Doctor Who audio drama UNIT Dominion
Lizzie Morrison, a fictional character in the 2004 film Dear Frankie
Betty Morrison, candidate in the Atlanta mayoral election, 1973

See also
Beth Morrison (disambiguation)